Armenia Alliance (HD) is an Armenian political alliance. It was founded in 2021 and is currently led by former President of Armenia Robert Kocharyan.

History
During the 2020–2021 Armenian protests, Robert Kocharyan endorsed the Homeland Salvation Movement, a political alliance calling for the resignation of the Armenian Prime Minister Nikol Pashinyan. Kocharyan later announced he would be re-entering politics with the foundation of a new political alliance. The Armenia Alliance held its founding ceremony in Yerevan on 9 May 2021 and consists of the Armenian Revolutionary Federation, the Reborn Armenia Party, and is led by Robert Kocharyan who will remain non-partisan.

The alliance had confirmed that it would participate in the 2021 Armenian parliamentary elections. The One Armenia Party announced it would nominate a single candidate to participate in the elections as part of the Armenia Alliance.

Following the 2021 election, the alliance won 21.1% of the popular vote, gaining 29 seats in the National Assembly and becoming the official opposition. Robert Kocharyan, who headed the alliance's electoral list, declined to take his seat in the National Assembly. Seyran Ohanyan was elected to lead the alliance's faction in parliament.

On 4 July 2022, Arthur Ghazinian, leader of the One Armenia Party announced that he was renouncing his parliamentary seat from the Armenia Alliance faction.

On 29 November 2022, Reborn Armenia members of parliament decided to terminate their positions in the National Assembly.

Ideology
The alliance seeks to develop national-state interests, pursue a foreign policy aimed at Armenia's protection and security, and stopping socio-economic decline. The alliance supports pursuing high levels of development, preventing a new wave of mass emigration, and creating the necessary foundations for lasting peace in the South Caucasus region.

The alliance also supports maintaining the territorial integrity and self-determination of Artsakh, protecting Armenia's borders, fighting corruption, improving the quality of public life, and supporting the activities of the Armenian Apostolic Church.

The alliance supports banning or severely restricting the activities of non-governmental and humanitarian organizations in Armenia that receive foreign funding.

Activities
On 9 May 2021, following the foundation of the alliance, Kocharyan led a rally in Freedom Square, Yerevan. During the rally, Kocharyan addressed his supporters.

Leadership
 Robert Kocharyan, Second President of Armenia
 Ishkhan Saghatelyan, Representative of the Supreme Body of the Armenian Revolutionary Federation
 Vahe Hakobyan, Chairman of the Reborn Armenia Party

Electoral record

Parliamentary elections

See also

 Programs of political parties in Armenia

References

External links 
 Armenia Alliance on Facebook

Political parties established in 2021
Political party alliances in Armenia
2021 establishments in Armenia